Jeremiah White may refer to:
Jeremiah White, a former soccer player
Jeremiah White (chaplain)

See also
Jerry White (disambiguation)